Paul Russell (born Glasgow, Scotland, 1955) is a professor in philosophy at Lund University, where he is Director of the Lund/Gothenburg Responsibility Project [LGRP].  His position at Lund is a half-time research position and has been made possible thanks to a major grant from the Swedish Research Council for "the international recruitment of leading researchers" (2014). Prior to his current position at Lund University he has held positions as Professor of  philosophy at the University of British Columbia, and at Gothenburg University.

Education and research 
Paul Russell holds an undergraduate degree from Edinburgh University (1979) and a PhD from Cambridge University (1986). At Cambridge his thesis work was supervised by Professor Sir Bernard Williams. He held a research fellowship at Sidney Sussex College, Cambridge from 1984 to 1987.

Apart from the positions mentioned above he has also held a number of visiting appointments at various universities, including University of Virginia (1988); Stanford University (1989–1990), where he held a Mellon Fellowship; University of Pittsburgh (1996–1997); and University of North Carolina at Chapel Hill (2005), where he was Kenan Distinguished Visitor. In 2010 he was the Fowler Hamilton Visiting Fellow at Christ Church, Oxford  and in 2023 he was Beaufort Visiting Fellow at St. John's College, Cambridge.

His principal research interests include problems of free will and moral responsibility and the history of early modern philosophy (particularly David Hume).

He is the author of Freedom and Moral Sentiment: Hume's Way of Naturalizing Responsibility (1995), The Riddle of Hume's Treatise: Skepticism, Naturalism, and Irreligion (2008), The Limits of Free Will: Selected Essays (2017), and Recasting Hume and Early Modern Philosophy: Selected Essays, all published by Oxford University Press. His book The Riddle of Hume's Treatise won the book prize from the Journal of the History of Philosophy in 2008, a prize bestowed on "the best published book in the history of philosophy." He has served on the editorial board of the journals Hume Studies and Journal of the History of Philosophy. 

Along with his academic publications he has also published opinion pieces and reviews in a variety of venues including, The Globe and Mail, the Vancouver Sun, the Times Literary Supplement, The Scotsman, and Aeon. Selections of his work have been translated into several languages, including Chinese, Polish, Italian and Hungarian.

In recent years Paul Russell has commented on and discussed issues relating to free speech on the university campus, including at the University of British Columbia.

Awards 

 2023 Beaufort Visiting Fellow, St. John's College, Cambridge 
 2014 Swedish Research Council (Vetenskapsrådet), Grants for International Recruitment of Leading Researchers. [Awarded to the University of Gothenburg and Lund University, recruited as researcher. ]
 2014 Killam Faculty Research Prize (UBC) 
 2010 Fowler Hamilton Visiting Fellow in the Humanities at Christ Church, Oxford 
 2010 Awarded the Journal of the History of Philosophy prize for the best published book in the history of philosophy in 2008 [The Riddle of Hume’s Treatise]. 
 2007 Killam Teaching Prize (UBC)
 1989 - 1990 Andrew W. Mellon Postdoctoral Fellowship, Stanford University
 1984 - 1986 Research Fellowship, Sidney Sussex College, Cambridge

Works 
Books

 Recasting Hume & Early Modern Philosophy: Selected Essays. New York (Oxford University Press: 2021).
 The Limits of Free Will: Selected Essays (Oxford University Press: 2017).
 The Riddle of Hume’s Treatise: Skepticism, Naturalism, and Irreligion (New York & Oxford: Oxford University Press: 2008). [Published in paperback 2010 with a new foreword.]	
 Freedom and Moral Sentiment: Hume's Way of Naturalizing Responsibility (New York & Oxford: Oxford University Press, 1995). Published in paperback, 2002. 

Books Introduced and Edited

 The Oxford Handbook of Hume. (Oxford University Press: 2016).
 The Philosophy of Free Will: Essential Readings from the Contemporary Debates, edited with Oisin Deery (Oxford University Press: 2013).
Free Will and Reactive Attitudes: Perspectives on P.F. Strawson’s “Freedom and Resentment”, Introduced and edited with Michael McKenna (Farnham: Ashgate: 2008).[ Reissued and published in paperback by Routledge, 2016.]
 Joseph J. Russell, Analysis and Dialectic: Studies in the Logic of Foundation Problems, Introduced and edited by P. Russell (The Hague: Nijhoff, 1984).

Wrote Introductions For

 David Hume, Dialoger om naturlig religion [Nya Doxa, 2020] Swedish translation by Jan Landgren. The edition is provided with a newly written preface by Paul Russell.

Further reading 
 
 
 
 Russell, Paul Why Religious Identities are not Immune to Criticism: AEON, August 2017 
 Russell, Paul Paul Russell on Bernard Williams: TLS, 18 December 2018 
 Russell, Paul Vice Dressed as Virtue AEON, May 2020

References

External links 
 Paul Russell, Lund University / University of British Columbia
 UBC prof wins $12 million from Sweden to explore global moral problems
 Hume’s Irreligious Core, Interview with 3:16 Magazine Interview by Richard Marshall.
 Philosophy Bites: Paul Russell on David Hume's Philosophy of Irreligion
 Philosophy Bites: Paul Russell on Fate

Living people
Academic staff of the University of British Columbia
Fellows of Sidney Sussex College, Cambridge
1955 births
 Canadian philosophers
Academic staff of Lund University